Bishkurayevo (Bişquray) is a rural locality (a selo) and the administrative centre of Bishkurayevsky Selsoviet, Ilishevsky District, Bashkortostan, Russia. The population was 433 as of 2010. There are 3 streets.

Geography 
Bishkurayevo is located 31 km southeast of Verkhneyarkeyevo (the district's administrative centre) by road. Malo-Bishkurayevo is the nearest rural locality.

References 

Rural localities in Ilishevsky District